Scuderia AlphaTauri, or simply AlphaTauri, is an Italian Formula One racing team and constructor. It is one of two Formula One constructors owned by Austrian beverage company Red Bull, the other being Red Bull Racing. The constructor was rebranded for the 2020 Formula One World Championship from "Toro Rosso" to "AlphaTauri" in order to promote the AlphaTauri fashion brand. According to Franz Tost and Helmut Marko, Scuderia AlphaTauri is no longer the junior team but the sister team to Red Bull Racing.

Origins

In September 2019, Toro Rosso announced their intention to change their naming rights for the 2020 championship. It was announced on 1 December 2019 that the team had selected "AlphaTauri" as their new moniker to promote parent company Red Bull's fashion label of the same name by purchasing Toro Rosso's naming rights. Thus, they became Scuderia AlphaTauri and retired the Scuderia Toro Rosso moniker after fourteen years. The team's involvement in Formula One can be traced back to the 1985 season when they first competed as Minardi. The team has been owned by Red Bull GmbH since the 2006 season.

Racing history

2020

AlphaTauri had Daniil Kvyat and Pierre Gasly drive for them in their debut season. The team remained with the Honda engine, being the team's engine partner since the  season. Sérgio Sette Câmara, Sébastien Buemi, and Jüri Vips were signed as the team's test drivers. The team achieved its first podium finish and race victory under the AlphaTauri name at the 2020 Italian Grand Prix, which also marked Pierre Gasly's first race victory and the first win for a French Formula One driver since Olivier Panis won the 1996 Monaco Grand Prix 24 years prior. AlphaTauri ended the year in 7th place on 107 points, 75 for Gasly and 32 for Kvyat.

2021 

For the 2021 season, AlphaTauri retained Gasly and signed Yuki Tsunoda to replace Kvyat. Gasly scored the team's first podium of the year by finishing in third place at the Azerbaijan Grand Prix. Gasly also consolidated this by finishing 4th at the Dutch and Mexico City Grands Prix. Tsunoda's best finish was 4th place at the Abu Dhabi Grand Prix.

2022 

Both drivers were retained for the 2022 season. AlphaTauri used Red Bull-branded Honda engines due to the former's subsequent takeover of the Honda engine programme due to Honda exiting Formula One at following the 2021 season.

2023 
Nyck de Vries and Yuki Tsunoda are due to be the team's drivers for the 2023 season, with Gasly moving to Alpine.

Complete Formula One results
(key)

Notes
 * – Season still in progress.
  – Driver did not finish the Grand Prix but was classified as they completed over 90% of the race distance.
  – Half points awarded as less than 75% of the race distance was completed.

References

External links
 

  
Formula One entrants
Red Bull sports teams
Faenza
Italian auto racing teams
Italian racecar constructors
2020 establishments in Italy
Auto racing teams established in 2020